Netherlands competed at the 1984 Summer Paralympics in Stoke Mandeville/New York City, United States. The team included 61 athletes, 40 men and 21 women. Competitors from Netherlands won 135 medals, including 55 gold, 52 silver and 28 bronze to finish 7th in the medal table.

See also
Netherlands at the Paralympics
Netherlands at the 1984 Summer Olympics

References 

Nations at the 1984 Summer Paralympics
1984
Summer Paralympics